Denis Arkadyevich Levitsky (born 5 February 1997) is a Belarusian professional footballer who plays for SKA-Khabarovsk.

Honours
Gomel
Belarusian Cup winner: 2021–22

References

External links 
 
 Profile at Dnepr Mogilev website
 

1997 births
Living people
Belarusian footballers
Belarus under-21 international footballers
Association football defenders
FC Dnepr Mogilev players
FC Torpedo-BelAZ Zhodino players
FC Belshina Bobruisk players
FC Gomel players
FC SKA-Khabarovsk players
Belarusian First League players
Belarusian Premier League players
Russian First League players
Belarusian expatriate footballers
Expatriate footballers in Russia
Belarusian expatriate sportspeople in Russia